Jalan Bahar is a major arterial road from Lim Chu Kang Road to Jurong West Avenue 2; originally a Jurong Road/Lim Chu Kang Road link. It was opened on 9 April 1965 to connect the rural areas of Lim Chu Kang to the Jurong Industrial Estate. It also connects through the Pan Island Expressway.

Jalan Bahar is located at the western part of Singapore , and is in close proximity to Tuas and Lim Chu Kang districts. A large portion of Jalan Bahar's land area is restricted and designated for the Singapore Armed Forces' live firing exercises and the Singapore Civil Defence' Basic Rescue Training exercises.

Primarily a wooded, forested area, the land at Jalan Bahar has been cleared over the years and is left undeveloped till today. Only a few commercial buildings stand here, mainly industrial buildings and educational institutions.

Etymology
In Malay, bahar refers to a large lake or river. A flyover also takes its name from the road.

History
Besides the Civil Defence Academy, Pusara Aman Muslim Cemetery as well as the entrance to Nanyang Technological University campus at Nanyang Road, there are few ongoing developments surrounding Jalan Bahar. The road had recently completed its road widening project in late 2016. The purpose of this project was to improve the current traffic situation and to support future developments and economic activities in the West Region.

References

Places in Singapore
Roads in Singapore